Filozofski vestnik is a philosophy journal published by the Institute of Philosophy of the Slovenian Academy of Sciences and Arts. It covers issues like contemporary political philosophy, history of philosophy, history of political thought, philosophy of law, social philosophy, epistemology, philosophy of science, cultural critique, ethics, and aesthetics. It is not committed to a particular philosophical orientation, style or school. The journal was established in 1980. It was issued semi-annual from 1980 to 1995 (with many double issues), three issues per year appeared since 1996. Articles are written in Slovene, English, French, and German. Rado Riha was the journal's editor-in-chief from 1996 to 2003.

References

See also 
 List of academic journals published in Slovenia

1980 establishments in Slovenia
Philosophy journals
Publications established in 1980
Open Humanities Press academic journals
Triannual journals
Academic journals of Slovenia
Slovenian Academy of Sciences and Arts
Multilingual journals
English-language journals
French-language journals
German-language journals
Slovene-language journals